Galina Dmitrievna Mitrokhina (born 9 February 1944) is a retired Russian sprinter and pentathlete. She won a silver medal in the 60 m at the 1966 European Indoor Games, and a bronze medal in the 100 m at the 1965 European Cup.

References

1944 births
Living people
Russian female sprinters
Russian pentathletes
Soviet female sprinters